Bryan Alceus (born 1 February 1996) is a professional footballer who plays as a midfielder for Cypriot First Division club Olympiakos Nicosia, on loan from Liga I club FC Argeș Pitești. Born in France, he plays for the Haiti national team.

Club career
Alceus previously played for Stade Bordelais, having started his career at Bordeaux.

On 27 January 2022, Alceus signed a two-and-a-half year contract with Azerbaijani club Zira.

International career
Alceus debuted for Haiti in a 3–1 friendly loss to Colombia on 29 May 2016.

International stats

References

External links

Alceus Bryan profile at Foot-national

1996 births
Living people
Association football forwards
Sportspeople from Colombes
Haitian footballers
Haiti international footballers
French footballers
FC Girondins de Bordeaux players
Entente SSG players
Paris FC players
FC Bastia-Borgo players
Championnat National players
CS Gaz Metan Mediaș players
FC Argeș Pitești players
Olympiakos Nicosia players
Liga I players
Ligue 2 players
Cypriot First Division players
Championnat National 2 players
Championnat National 3 players
Haitian expatriate footballers
French expatriate footballers
Haitian expatriate sportspeople in Romania
Haitian expatriate sportspeople in Cyprus
Expatriate footballers in Romania
French sportspeople of Haitian descent
Footballers from Hauts-de-Seine
2015 CONCACAF U-20 Championship players
2019 CONCACAF Gold Cup players
2021 CONCACAF Gold Cup players
Citizens of Haiti through descent
Expatriate footballers in Azerbaijan
French expatriate sportspeople in Azerbaijan
French expatriate sportspeople in Romania
French expatriate sportspeople in Cyprus
Black French sportspeople